David Goffin was the defending champion, but chose to compete in the China Open.

Seeds

Draw

Finals

Top half

Bottom half

References
 Main Draw
 Qualifying Draw

Ethias Trophy - Singles
2015 Ethias Trophy